Elections to Penwith District Council were held on 6 May 1999.  One third of the council was up for election and the council stayed under no overall control. Overall turnout was 34.1%.

After the election, the composition of the council was:
Liberal Democrat 9
Conservative 9
Independent 8
Labour 5
Others 2
Vacant 1

Results

References

1999 Penwith election result
Turnout figures

1999 English local elections
1999
1990s in Cornwall